Demonoir is the fifth full-length album by Norwegian black metal band 1349. The new album shows "a return to the band's more traditional, raw-yet-technical black metal sound." It was released on 26 April 2010 in Europe and the day after in North America.

Track listing
 "Tunnels of Set I" – 1:04 (Ravn, Archaon)
 "Atomic Chapel" – 6:24 (Destroyer, Archaon)
 "Tunnel II" – 1:01 (Ravn, Archaon)
 "When I Was Flesh" – 5:45 (Destroyer, Archaon)
 "Tunnel III" – 0:39 (Archaon)
 "Psalm 7:77" – 5:42 (Destroyer, Archaon)
 "Tunnel IV" – 1:02 (Ravn, Archaon)
 "Pandemonium War Bells" – 7:48 (Destroyer, Archaon, Frost, Seidemann)
 "Tunnel V" – 1:15 (Ravn, Archaon)
 "The Devil of the Desert" – 6:30 (Archaon, Seidemann)
 "Tunnel VI" – 1:32 (Ravn, Archaon)
 "Demonoir" – 6:19 (Frost, Archaon)
 "Tunnel VII" – 3:53 (Ravn, Archaon)

Limited edition bonus disc
 "Rapture" (Morbid Angel cover)
 "Strike of the Beast" (Exodus cover)
 "Nerves" (Bauhaus cover)

Limited boxset bonus disc
 "Rapture" (Morbid Angel cover)
 "Strike of the Beast" (Exodus cover)
 "Nerves" (Bauhaus cover)
 "The Heretic" (Possessed cover)
 "Pandemonium War Bells" (live)
 "When I Was Flesh" (live)
 "Atomic Chapel" (live)

Personnel

1349
Ravn – vocals, sampling, production
Archaon – guitars
Seidemann – bass, backing vocals
Frost – drums

Additional personnel
b9, Ash in Plastic Bag, Gutta På Loftet Productions – additional sampling
Tony Caputo – piano
Ronni Le Tekrø – lead guitar on "Psalm 7:77", backing vocals
Thorbjørn "Tobben" Benjaminsen – horns
1349 – arrangement
Archaon – production
Thomas Gabriel Fischer – production
Kjartan Hesthagen – engineering
Kjetil Ottersen – mastering

References 

1349 (band) albums
2010 albums